Ricardo Alberto Trigueño Foster (born 17 April 1980) is a Guatemalan football goalkeeper who currently plays for Zacapa in the Primera División de Ascenso.

Club career
Trigueño started his career at Aurora before moving to Suchitepéquez, who he left after only one season. After joining Marquense in 2005 he joined Petapa in 2007. In late 2009, Marquense appealed to CAS since they argued they still owned his sporting rights.

International career
He made his debut for Guatemala in a January 2003 friendly match against El Salvador and had earned 51 caps at the start of January 2010. He has represented his country during the 2006 World Cup qualification campaign, as well as at the 2007 CONCACAF Gold Cup

References

External links
 
 

1980 births
Living people
People from Izabal Department
Association football goalkeepers
Guatemalan footballers
Guatemala international footballers
2003 UNCAF Nations Cup players
2007 UNCAF Nations Cup players
2007 CONCACAF Gold Cup players
Aurora F.C. players
C.D. Suchitepéquez players
Deportivo Marquense players
C.D. Malacateco players
Deportivo Petapa players